Huffman Independent School District is a public school district based in Huffman—an unincorporated area of northeastern Harris County, Texas (USA) within the Houston–The Woodlands–Sugar Land metropolitan area.

Huffman ISD serves a small portion of the city of Houston.

In 2009, the school district was rated "recognized" by the Texas Education Agency.

 the district had 3,500 students.

Schools

Secondary schools:
 Hargrave High School
 Huffman Middle School

Primary schools:
 Huffman Elementary School
 Falcon Ridge Elementary School
  it had 748 students. It opened in 2018, was designed by Huckabee & Associates, and was built through contractor Paradigm Construction LLC, which the company Bond Program Management Services, used by Huffman ISD to manage its school bond programs, chose. The bond that had the school built was approved by voters in May 2016. Construction delays resulted after Hurricane Harvey. By December 2018 defects began to appear in the building, and Huffman ISD has frozen payments to the contractor. Lawsuits have been filed over the matter.

Former schools:
 Huffman Intermediate School
 Copeland Elementary School
 Ben Bowen Early Childhood Center

References

External links

 

School districts in Harris County, Texas
School districts in Houston